Alfred George Buckham (6 November 1879 – 21 September 1956) was a British photographer who specialised in aerial photography.

Career
Buckham was born in London on 6 November 1879. He began his career in photography in 1905 and joined the Royal Naval Air Service as a reconnaissance photographer in 1917. He became the first head of aerial reconnaissance for the Royal Navy in the First World War and later a captain in the Royal Naval Air Service.

Buckham was involved in 9 crashes, 8 of which saw him relatively unscathed. After the ninth, however, he had to have a tracheotomy and breathed through a small pipe in his neck for the rest of his life. Despite this, he carried on his aerial photography career, often in very perilous conditions. He felt the best shots were made standing up, writing "If one's right leg is tied to the seat with a scarf or a piece of rope, it is possible to work in perfect security".

Bibliography
A Vision of Flight: The Aerial Photography of Alfred G. Buckham. Stroud, UK: The History Press, 2008. .

See also
 Aerial photography

References

External links 
 
 National Galleries of Scotland

Photographers from London
1879 births
1956 deaths
Aerial photographers